Leonard Philip Stark (born July 5, 1969) is an American lawyer who serves as a United States circuit judge of the United States Court of Appeals for the Federal Circuit. He is a former United States district judge of the United States District Court for the District of Delaware and was a United States magistrate judge of the same district.

Early life and education 

Born July 5, 1969, in Detroit, Stark earned a Bachelor of Arts and a Bachelor of Science in history and political science and a Master of Arts in history from the University of Delaware, all in 1991. Stark also earned a Doctor of Philosophy in politics from Magdalen College at the University of Oxford in 1993 as a Rhodes Scholar.  Finally, Stark earned a Juris Doctor from Yale Law School in 1996. From 1996 until 1997, Stark served as a law clerk to United States Court of Appeals for the Third Circuit Judge Walter King Stapleton.

Professional career 

From 1997 until 2001, Stark was an associate with the Wilmington, Delaware office of the law firm Skadden, Arps, Slate, Meagher & Flom, where he specialized in corporate and securities law. From 2002 until 2007, Stark served as an Assistant United States Attorney in Wilmington, Delaware.

Federal judicial service

United States magistrate judge tenure 
In 2007, the judges on the United States District Court for the District of Delaware selected Stark to be a United States magistrate judge in Wilmington.

United States district court service 
On March 17, 2010, President Barack Obama nominated Stark to fill the district court vacancy created by the elevation of Judge Kent A. Jordan to the United States Court of Appeals for the Third Circuit in 2006. On August 5, 2010, he was confirmed in the United States Senate by unanimous consent and he received commission on August 10, 2010. He became Chief Judge on July 1, 2014, and served until July 1, 2021. His service as the district court judge was terminated on March 17, 2022 when he was elevated to the United States Court of Appeals for the Federal Circuit.

Court of appeals service 

On November 3, 2021, President Joe Biden nominated Stark to serve as a United States circuit judge of the United States Court of Appeals for the Federal Circuit. President Biden nominated Stark to the seat vacated by Judge Kathleen M. O'Malley, who retired on March 11, 2022. On December 1, 2021, a hearing on his nomination was held before the Senate Judiciary Committee. On January 3, 2022, his nomination was returned to the President under Rule XXXI, Paragraph 6 of the United States Senate; he was later renominated the same day. On January 13, 2022, his nomination was reported out of committee by a 16–6 vote. On February 3, 2022, the Senate invoked cloture on his nomination by a 54–33 vote. On February 9, 2022, his nomination was confirmed by a 61–35 vote. He received his judicial commission on March 16, 2022.

References

External links

|-

1969 births
Living people
21st-century American judges
Alumni of Magdalen College, Oxford
American Rhodes Scholars
Assistant United States Attorneys
Delaware lawyers
Judges of the United States Court of Appeals for the Federal Circuit
Judges of the United States District Court for the District of Delaware
People from Wilmington, Delaware
Skadden, Arps, Slate, Meagher & Flom people
United States court of appeals judges appointed by Joe Biden
United States district court judges appointed by Barack Obama
United States magistrate judges
University of Delaware alumni
University of Delaware faculty
Yale Law School alumni